Pristimantis platydactylus is a species of frog in the family Strabomantidae.
It is found in Bolivia and Peru.
Its natural habitats are tropical moist lowland forests, moist montane forests, high-altitude shrubland, and heavily degraded former forest.
It is threatened by habitat loss.

References

platydactylus
Amphibians of the Andes
Amphibians of Bolivia
Amphibians of Peru
Amphibians described in 1903
Taxonomy articles created by Polbot